ISO-IR-197 (known by the ISO-IR registration number of its GR set) is an 8-bit, single-byte character encoding which was designed for the Sámi languages. It is a modification of ISO 8859-1, replacing certain punctuation and symbol characters with additional letters used in certain Sámi orthographies.

ISO-IR-197 was proposed for establishment as a part of ISO/IEC 8859 in 1996 (as part 14 and, later, part 15), but was not accepted for this. However, ISO-IR-197 is referenced in an informative ISO/IEC 8859 annex, which lists it as an encoding which provides a more adequate coverage of the orthography of certain Sámi languages such as Skolt Sámi than ISO-8859-4 or ISO-8859-10, unless the latter is combined with ISO-IR-158.

Code page layout 
Differences from ISO 8859-1 have their Unicode code point.

Windows extension
As documented by Evertype, some Windows implementations use a variant which adds graphical characters to the C1 area (0x80-9F), including some of the other characters from the Mac OS Sámi repertoire. This was intended to be analogous to the Windows version of Latin-1 (i.e. Windows-1252), and follows its layout where possible. Differences from Windows-1252 have their Unicode code point:

ISO-IR-209
ISO-IR-209 is an update that replaced the guillemets at 0xAB and 0xBB with the letter H with caron to add Finnish Romani support.

References 

ISO/IEC 8859